Büttner is a German surname. Notable people with the surname include:

Alexander Büttner (born 1989), Dutch footballer
Brenda Buttner (1961–2017), American senior business correspondent
Christian Büttner (born 1979), German record producer and musician, known as TheFatRat
Erich Büttner (painter) (1889–1936), German painter
Erich Büttner (pilot) (died 1945), German World War II fighter ace
Hieronymus Büttner (c. 1480 – 1546/47), Silesian Printer and publisher
Jean Buttner, chairman of the board, president, CEO, and COO of Value Line, Inc. and Arnold Bernhard & Co., Inc
Karin Büttner-Janz (born 1952), medical doctor, Olympic medal winner in artistic gymnastics, chief physician of the orthopedic Vivantes hospital in Friedrichshain
Karina Buttner, beauty queen who won the Miss Paraguay contest in 2005, qualifying for that year's Miss Universe contest in Thailand
Kurt Büttner (1881–1967), German entomologist who specialised in Heteroptera Kurt Büttner was a physician
Matthias Büttner (born 1990), German politician
Paul Büttner (1870–1943), German composer
Richard Büttner (1858–1927), German botanist and mineralogist involved in the exploration of the Congo
Steffen Büttner (born 1963), German former footballer who played as a defender

Companies
Büttner Propeller, a German propeller and aircraft manufacturer